Alex Szabó (born 26 August 1998) is a Hungarian professional footballer who plays for Kecskemét.

Club career
In July 2021 Szabó signed for Kecskemét.

Career statistics

.

References

External links

HLSZ 

1998 births
Living people
People from Nagyatád
Hungarian footballers
Association football defenders
Kaposvári Rákóczi FC players
Kecskeméti TE players
Nemzeti Bajnokság I players
Nemzeti Bajnokság II players
Sportspeople from Somogy County